Chris Eggleston (born March 27, 1989) is an American professional stock car racing driver. He last competed part-time in the NASCAR Camping World Truck Series, driving the Nos. 17 and 54 Toyota Tundras for DGR-Crosley. He previously competed in the NASCAR K&N Pro Series West, where he won the 2015 championship.

Racing career

His first year of racing was 2009 and was immediately successful as he won the ASA Late Model Series Northern Division championship driving for 5K Motorsports. He managed to win two out of ten races. He also competed in the ASA Late Model Series Challenge Division and got one podium and one pole position and became 4th in the championship. In addition he competed in the NASCAR Whelen All-American Series and managed to become 15th in his home state Colorado. In 2010 he made a big step in his career driving five races in the NASCAR Camping World Truck Series for the SS-Green Light Racing team. His best result of the season was an 11th place at Martinsville Speedway. In 2011 he drove just a few races in three different championships: the PASS South, the ASA Midwest Tour and the NASCAR K&N Pro Series West. He did not enter any registered race events and championships in 2012 and 2013. He returned to racing in 2014. He made his return in the NASCAR Camping World Truck Series, again for the SS-Green Light Racing team, and became 19th in the American Ethanol 200, his only NCWTS race that year. He became 24th in the championship in the NASCAR K&N Pro Series West after winning one of the three races he entered and he also raced in the ARCA/CRA Super Series. In 2015 he competes a full year in the NASCAR K&N Pro Series West with the Bill McAnally Racing team, the same team as in 2014.

In 2018, it was announced that Eggleston would make his return to the NASCAR Camping World Truck Series with David Gilliland’s new team, DGR-Crosley, driving the 17 truck part-time starting with Charlotte. However, Eggleston moved to the No. 54 truck due to rain.

Motorsports career results

NASCAR
(key) (Bold – Pole position awarded by qualifying time. Italics – Pole position earned by points standings or practice time. * – Most laps led. ** – All laps led.)

Camping World Truck Series

K&N Pro Series West

 Season still in progress
 Ineligible for series points

References

External links
 
 
 

Living people
1989 births
Racing drivers from Colorado
Racing drivers from Denver
NASCAR drivers
People from Erie, Colorado